Conlan Press is an American publishing company that markets a variety of fantasy books, art books, and graphic novels. The company was formed in 2005 by Connor Freff Cochran to promote the works of Peter Beagle, author of the 1968 book The Last Unicorn, which was adapted into a popular 1982 animated film of the same title. In 2014, Conlan enlisted the services of Public Relations professional Reece Mack to assist with the public perception of The Last Unicorn movie and Conlan itself. Reece resigned after Conlan refused to resolve complaints and upon Beagle filing his lawsuit.

Clients

Artists
 Mark Badger
 John Howe

Authors and author/artists
 Peter S. Beagle
 Connor Cochran

References

External links
 Conlan Press Official Website

publishing companies of the United States